Kris Stookey (born June 30, 1969) is an American yacht racer who competed in the 1996 Summer Olympics.

Sailing history 
Stookey sailed in college at Brown University where she won All-American honors four times, first as a Women's All American in 1988, then as Honorable Mention in the Coed Group in 1989, and finally as All American in 1990 and 1991. In 1988, Stookey won the Madeleine Cup for winning skipper of the 'A' division in the Inter-Collegiate Sailing Association's  Women's Championship. In 1991, Stookey helped the Brown team to earning the Leonard M. Fowle Trophy for the best overall collegiate team in sailing, the first time an Ivy League college won the award.

Stookey placed second at the 1992 Olympic trials in the 470 class sailing with Louise Van Voorhis, and won the 1996 Olympic 470 trials again sailing with Van Voorhis. They went on to win fourth place at the 1996 Summer Olympics.

Awards and honors 
Stookey graduated high school from Kent School in 1987 and in 2012 was nominated into their Hall of Fame for her accomplishments in sailing.

References

1969 births
Living people
American female sailors (sport)
Olympic sailors of the United States
Sailors at the 1996 Summer Olympics – 470
21st-century American women